Taraqqi may refer to:
Goli Taraqqi, Iranian writer
Taraqqi, Iran, a village in Razavi Khorasan Province, Iran